The cabinet of Alphonse Henri d'Hautpoul was formed by President Louis Napoleon Bonaparte after he had dismissed the second cabinet of Odilon Barrot on 31 October  1849. The Hautpoul cabinet was made up of friends of the president rather than members of the assembly, and was led by Alphonse Henri d'Hautpoul.

On 24 January 1851, the cabinet was replaced by the Petit ministère of 1851.

Ministers
The ministers were:

Changes
 On 17 November 1849, Jean-Ernest Ducos de La Hitte substituted Alphonse de Rayneval as Foreign Affairs Minister.
 On 15 March 1850, Pierre Jules Baroche substituted Ferdinand Barrot as Interior Minister.
 On 22 October 1850, Jean-Paul de Schramm substituted Alphonse Henri d'Hautpoul as War Minister.

Upon 9 January 1851, the ministry was totally reshuffled with those who were aligned with President Louis-Napoléon Bonaparte. The ministers were:

References

Sources

French governments
1849 establishments in France
1851 disestablishments in France
Cabinets established in 1849
Cabinets disestablished in 1851